In cryptography, NUSH is a block cipher invented by Anatoly Lebedev and Alexey Volchkov for the Russian company LAN Crypto. It was submitted to the NESSIE project, but was not selected.

NUSH exists in several different variants, using keys of 128, 192, or 256 bits, and a block size of 64, 128, or 256 bits. The number of rounds is 9, 17, or 33, depending on the block size. The algorithm uses key whitening, but no S-boxes; the only operations it uses are AND, OR, XOR, modular addition, and bit rotation.

It has been shown that linear cryptanalysis can break NUSH with less effort than a brute force attack.

References

Broken block ciphers